Federal elections were  held in Switzerland on 23 October 2011. 
All of the Federal Assembly were to be elected: all 200 seats in the National Council and all 46 seats in the Council of States.

Voter turnout was 49.1%, compared to 48.9% in 2007.

National Council
At the last election, in 2007, the Swiss People's Party (SVP) won the highest share of the vote ever recorded for a single party in Switzerland, with 29% of the vote.  Soon after, a moderate faction split from the SVP, forming the Conservative Democratic Party (BDP).

In the 2011 election, the two neophyte parties BDP and Green Liberal Party (GLP) were successful, each receiving 5.4% of the popular vote. 
Both the GLP and the BDP have gained the required five seats to form their own parliamentary groups, suggesting a split of the centrist CVP/EVP/glp group.

All other major parties lost votes, the Swiss People's Party (SVP) for the first time since the 1987 elections. With 26.6% of the popular vote, the SVP is still the strongest party by a comfortable margin, but the 2011 elections marked the end of its rapid growth during the period of 1995–2007.

Of the small parties (below 5 seats), the Evangelical People's Party received 2.0% of the vote (+0.4%), retaining its two seats. The Ticino League received 0.8% of the vote (+0.2%) and gains one seat, now holding two.

The Christian Social Party lost one seat, but gained another to remain in the National Council, while the Federal Democratic Union of Switzerland and Swiss Party of Labour lost their single seats.  Other minor groups which gathered more than 0.1% of the popular vote are: the Swiss Pirate Party (0.48%), the Swiss Democrats (0.20%), parteifrei.ch (0.19%) and Tierpartei Schweiz (0.15%).

By constituency

Council of States
The elections of the Council of States are done by a plurality voting system. 
27 out of 46 seats were determined on the first ballot on 23 October; the remaining 19 seats were decided in a second ballot held in November.

By canton

Pre-election polls

Notes and references

External links

Federal elections in Switzerland
2011 elections in Switzerland
October 2011 events in Europe